The speaker of the Pennsylvania House of Representatives holds the oldest statewide elected office in the Commonwealth of Pennsylvania. Since its first session under the Frame of Government in 1682, presided over by William Penn, over 130 House members have been elevated to the speaker's chair. The house cannot hold an official session in the absence of the speaker or their designated speaker pro tempore.

Speaker K. Leroy Irvis was the first African-American elected speaker of any state legislature in the United States since the Reconstruction era. 

Current Speaker Joanna McClinton is the first female and first female African-American speaker.

List of speakers of the Provincial Assembly
Speakers of the Pennsylvania Provincial Assembly (1682–1775) and the General Assembly of the Commonwealth of Pennsylvania (following the 1776 Constitution).

List of speakers of the Pennsylvania House of Representatives

See also
 List of Pennsylvania state legislatures

References

 
 
 

Speakers
Pennsylvania